Archeriidae is a family of embolomeres that lived in the Permian period. Archeria is a well known genus of archeriid.

Embolomeres
Permian first appearances
Permian extinctions